The saddle-billed stork or saddlebill (Ephippiorhynchus senegalensis) is a large wading bird in the stork family, Ciconiidae. It is a widespread species which is a resident breeder in sub-Saharan Africa from Sudan, Ethiopia and Kenya south to South Africa, and in The Gambia, Senegal, Côte d'Ivoire and Chad in west Africa. It is considered endangered in South Africa.

It is a close relative of the widespread Asian and Australian black-necked stork, the only other member of the genus Ephippiorhynchus.

Description

Among the large storks, the saddle-billed broadly overlap in size with the two larger Leptoptilos and the Jabiru stork but possesses a longer, more slender neck and slightly longer legs than the other largest storks, so the saddle-billed is likely to be the tallest extant species of the family. Its extremely long legs measure up to ) in tarsus length. The sexes can be readily distinguished by the golden yellow irises of the female and the brown irises and dangling yellow wattles of the male. It is therefore one of the few storks to display sexual dimorphism in colour.

It is spectacularly plumaged; both the female and male appear identical when perched but the female shows much more white in the primaries in flight. The head, neck, back, wings, and tail are iridescent black, with the rest of the body and the primary flight feathers being white. Juveniles are browner grey in plumage. The massive bill is red with a black band and a yellow frontal shield (the "saddle"). The legs and feet are black with pink hocks. On the chest is a bare red patch of skin, whose colour darkens during breeding season.

Behaviour
They are silent except for bill-clattering at the nest. Like most storks, these fly with the neck outstretched, not retracted like a heron; in flight, the large heavy bill is kept drooping somewhat below belly height, giving these birds a very unusual appearance to those who see them for the first time. To experienced birdwatchers on the other hand, this makes them easily recognizable even if seen from a distance. It has been suggested that due to the large size and unusual appearance in flight, this species is the basis for the "big bird" and kongamato cryptids.

Habitat
At the continental scale, saddle-billed storks preferred protected areas that have a higher extent of open water compared to areas without other storks. Some of these trends may, however, be due to a bias in coverage by ornithologists of safer areas such as national parks and protected swamps that afford easier accessibility and comforts.

Breeding
The saddle-billed storks are solitary nesters, building massive nest platforms that are used repeatedly in successive seasons. Unlike many other storks, these species are often seen in pairs in the nonbreeding season suggesting a lifelong pair bond. They breed in forested wetlands and other floodplains in tropical lowlands. It builds a large, deep stick nest in a tree, laying one to five (typically two or three) white eggs weighing about  each. The incubation period is 30–35 days, with another 70–100 days before the chicks fledge, with the young often remaining in the parents' territory until the next breeding season.

Food and feeding

They search for prey by stabbing the bill into the water, catching prey by contact, and in the same way into mud and vegetation. Prey are jabbed with the bill. It swallows the fish head first and then, drinks some water.

Relation to Ancient Egyptian culture
This bird is represented in an Ancient Egyptian hieroglyph (Gardiner G29) that had the phonetic value "bꜣ": G29 Its description is often erroneously given as "jabiru", which is a South American relative. The Third Dynasty pharaoh Khaba incorporated this hieroglyph in his name (Jiménez Serrano 2002). The first depictions of the species come from depictions during the Late Predynastic Period (pre-3150 B.C.), and trends in depictions have been useful to deduce a decline in the species' range from ancient Egypt likely due to intensifying urbanisation and an increasingly arid climate (c. 2686–2181 BC).

References

Further reading

Barlow, Clive (1997): A field guide to birds of the Gambia and Senegal. Pica Press, Nr. Robertsbridge (East Sussex). 
Jiménez Serrano, Alejandro (2002): Royal Festivals in the Late Predynastic Period and the First Dynasty. British Archaeological Reports (International Series) 1076.

External links

Saddle-billed Stork – The Atlas of Southern African Birds

saddle-billed stork
Birds of Sub-Saharan Africa
saddle-billed stork
Articles containing video clips
Taxa named by George Shaw